Jammu Kashmir Democratic Liberation Party is a separatist political party in Jammu Kashmir founded by its chairman, Hashim Qureshi in 1994.

References 

"JKDLP's Official Website" Retrieved on 16 September 2009
 "Separatist in 1971 Hijacking Surrenders on Return to India" Los Angeles Times Retrieved on 7 August 2009
"Interview with Basharat Peer" Rediff.com Retrieved on 7 August 2009
"Interview to Assistant Editor Chindu Sreedharan. Part 1" Rediff.com Retrieved on 7 August 2009
"Interview to Assistant Editor Chindu Sreedharan. Part 2" Rediff.com Retrieved on 7 August 2009
"JK Democratic Liberation Party Home page" Retrieved on 7 August 2009
"Kashmir Round table Conference: An Opportunity Lost" Retrieved on 7 August 2009
"Return of trust and hope" The Hindu, by Aditi Bhaduri Retrieved on 7 August 2009
"Kashmir Roundtable: The Beginning of a Process?" Dwelle Retrieved on 7 August 2009
"Britain deports JKDLP leader" The Hindu Retrieved on 7 August 2009
"Violence not the solution, AI hijacker Qureshi tells Kashmiris" Indian Express Retrieved on 2 September 2009

External links
 Official site

Political parties in Jammu and Kashmir
Kashmir separatist movement
Political parties established in 1994
1994 establishments in Jammu and Kashmir